German submarine U-993 was a Type VIIC U-boat of Nazi Germany's Kriegsmarine during World War II.

Construction 
The U-993 was laid down on 16 November 1942 at the Blohm & Voss yard in Hamburg, Germany. She was launched on 8 July 1943 and commissioned on 19 August 1943 under the command of Oberleutnant zur See Kurt Hilbig, who was replaced on 17 August 1944 by Oberleutnant zur See Karl-Heinz Steinmetz. Her U-boat emblem was 13 and Clover.

She was assessed at  submerged. She had two shafts and two  propellers.

The submarine was fitted with five  torpedo tubes (four fitted at the bow and one at the stern), fourteen torpedoes, one  deck gun (220 rounds) and a  Flak M42 anti-aircraft gun. The boat had a complement of 44 to 57 men.

Service history
U-993 was used as a Training ship in the 5th U-boat Flotilla from 19 August 1943 until 29 February 1944  where she had been trained and tested at the individual commands (UAK, TEK, AGRU-Front, etc.) and had been part of Ausbildungsflottillen (26th U-boat Flotilla, 27th U-boat Flotilla, etc.) for remaining works and equipment, before serving in the 3rd U-boat Flotilla for active service on 1 March 1944.

Patrols And Incidents 
During her active service, U-993 made 3 patrols. She left Marviken on 23 March 1944 for her first patrol and patrolled the North Atlantic between Ireland and Newfoundland. On 17 April 1944 at 3.51am, northwest of Cape Finisterre, U-993 was attacked by a British B-24 Liberator BZ945 (53 Sqdn RAF/O, pilot F/L L.M. Burton). The B-24 strafed the boat in a Leigh Light attack and dropped two depth charges and a small bomb on the submarine, which fell wide, causing no damage. The plane however wasn't so lucky as it was hit by flak during the approach, which set one of the port engines on fire. The plane crashed in the sea and exploded on impact approx. 600m (656 yds) from the submarine, all 11 aircrew were killed in the crash. The U-993 arrived in Lorient on 22 April 1944 without further incident, after a patrol of 31 days.

U-993 left Lorient for her second patrol on 6 June 1944 and patrolled the Atlantic Ocean, but she stayed close to the French coast. She arrived in Brest on 14 June 1944 after a patrol of 9 days.

The submarine left Brest for her third and last patrol on 17 August 1944 under the command of a new commander, Oberleutnant zur See Karl-Heinz Steinmetz. The submarine was also fitted with a Schnorchel underwater-breathing apparatus in August 1944. She patrolled the North Atlantic and sailed West off the coast of Ireland and north of the Faroe Islands. On 12 September 1944, a crew member died of jaundice in the North Atlantic. The submarine arrived Bergen on 18 September 1944 after a patrol of 33 days. In total, U-993 spend 76 days at sea.

Sinking 
On 4 October 1944, U-993 was stationed in the Laksevaag shipyard at Bergen, Norway. At 9.30am, 47 Lancaster Bomber and 93 Halifax bomber of 6 RCAF and 8 RAF Group threw a total of 603 bombs which each weight 1000 pounds on the port of Bergen. Seven bombs hit the submarine bunker, but focused on the thick reinforced concrete slabs resulted in almost no damage. Only the electrical wiring was destroyed and the repair yards were severely damaged.

Twenty of the Allied machinery had received specific objective instructions for damaging and/or destroying unprotected submarines in the port. One man died on U-993 and another man died the following day of his injuries; the survivor count is unknown. The submarine was later salvaged and decommissioned. After the war in May 1945, the submarine was captured by British forces and broken up.

References

Bibliography

German Type VIIC submarines
U-boats commissioned in 1943
World War II submarines of Germany
Ships built in Hamburg
1943 ships
Maritime incidents in October 1944
Shipwrecks in the Atlantic Ocean